Ваня (Vanya), a male diminutive of the Russian, Croatian, Serbian, Bulgarian and other Slavic given names Ivan. It is the Russian, Serbian, Bulgarian and other Slavic form of John itself derived from a Hebrew name, meaning "God is gracious" or "Graced by God". An alternative spelling of the name is Vanja. In Russia it is a male given name, in Bosnia and Herzegovina mainly a male given name, in Serbia and Croatia it is a unisex name. In the Scandinavian countries and in Bulgaria, it is a female given name.

Vanya may refer to:

People

Given name 
 Vanya Cullen, winemaker
 Vanya Dermendzhieva (born 1958), Bulgarian former basketball player
 Vanya Gospodinova (born 1958), retired Bulgarian middle-distance runner
 Vanya Kewley (1937–2012), British journalist, documentary maker, and nurse
 Vanya Marinova (born 1950), retired Bulgarian gymnast
 Vanya Milanova (born 1954), violinist and recording artist
 Vanya Mirzoyan (born 1948), Armenian scientist-mathematician
 Vanya Mishra (born 1992), Indian actress, engineer, entrepreneur, and beauty pageant titleholder
 Vanya Petkova (1944–2009), Bulgarian poet and writer
 Vanya Shivashankar, competitive speller
 Vanya Shtereva (born 1970), Bulgarian singer and writer
 Vanya Sokolova (born 1971), former Bulgarian volleyball playernational team
 Vanya Voynova (1934–1993), Bulgarian basketball player

Surname 
 Mária Vanya, Hungarian handballer

Art and entertainment 
 Uncle Vanya, a 1897 tragicomedy by the Russian playwright Anton Chekhov
 The Vanyar are a kindred of elves in the fiction of J. R. R. Tolkien. The singular form of "Vanyar" is "Vanya". 
 Vanya/Viktor Hargreeves in The Umbrella Academy comic book by Gerard Way

Other uses 
 The codename for the Tsar Bomba, a powerful nuclear weapon
 Vanya-class minesweeper, minesweepers built for the Soviet Navy between 1960 and 1973

See also 
Vanja
Wanja

de:Wanja
fr:Vania